Breakfast, Lunch & Dinner is a 2019 American documentary web television series. The premise revolves around chef David Chang meeting a celebrity in a large city in each episode, talking about food and eating various local foods.

Episodes

Release 
Breakfast, Lunch & Dinner was released on October 23, 2019, on Netflix.

References

External links
 
 

2019 American television series debuts
2010s American documentary television series
English-language Netflix original programming
Netflix original documentary television series